Bibi is the first EP of Chinese singer Bibi Zhou, released on June 1, 2006.

The song "Only Me left" won a TVB8 Mandarin Music on Demand Award for Top 10 Songs of the Year in 2006.

Track listing 
 "Only Me Left" (只剩我一个) – 3:10
 "Uh…" (呃…) – 3:53
 "Doesn't Hurt" (不痛) – 4:13
 "Swan" (天鹅) – 3:23

References 

2006 EPs
Bibi Zhou albums